City Contemporary Dance Company (CCDC) is a leading modern dance company in Hong Kong. Dr Willy Tsao founded the company in 1979 and he was the Artistic Director from 1989 to 2019. In May 2020, Yuri Ng was appointed as the 4th Artistic Director, succeeding Dr Willy Tsao. The company is supported by the Government of Hong Kong Special Administrative Region.

CCDC has presented more than 200 original works to critical acclaim, including productions by Tsao and other leading choreographers, such as Helen Lai, Mui Cheuk-yin, Pun Siu-fai and Yuri Ng. It has also presented innovative collaborations with outstanding artists from other media and with artists from around the world. CCDC is renowned for reflecting the vigour and creativity of Hong Kong’s vibrant, multifaceted contemporary culture, sharing dance works to an audience of more than 50,000 people annually.

CCDC's performances reflect the creativity of Hong Kong's vibrant and multifaceted culture. It has an annual audience of 100,000 and has made 66 international tours to over 30 cities including New York City, Montreal, London, Paris, Berlin, Lyon, Sydney, Tokyo, Seoul, Singapore, Manila, Beijing, Shanghai, Taipei, Munich, Stuttgart, Mumbai, Delhi, Brisbane, Copenhagen, Prague, Karmiel (Israel), St. Petersburg, Moscow, Los Angeles, and Washington, D.C.

Since 1989, CCDC has been actively engaged in supporting dance development in China.

References

External links
 

Culture of Hong Kong
Contemporary dance companies
Dance companies in China
1979 establishments in Hong Kong